Howard William Bedell (born September 29, 1935 in Clearfield, Pennsylvania) is an American former Major League Baseball player, coach and front-office administrator. An outfielder, Bedell played for the Milwaukee Braves in 1962 and the Philadelphia Phillies in 1968. Bedell graduated from Pottstown Senior High School and attended West Chester University. 

In MLB, Bedell played in 67 games and registered 28 hits,  three runs batted in and scored 15 runs. He batted .193. Fifty-eight of his 67 games played, all 15 of his runs scored, 27 of his 28 hits and two of his three RBIs were with the Braves. Bedell's lone RBI as a Phillie came in a game against the Los Angeles Dodgers at Dodger Stadium on June 8, . Pinch-hitting in the top of the fifth inning, Bedell hit a sacrifice fly to score Tony Taylor for a run that ended Don Drysdale's string of 58 consecutive scoreless innings.

Bedell played almost 1,400 games in minor league baseball, and his active career stretched over 13 seasons (1957–1969).

After his playing career ended, Bedell held both on- and off-field posts with MLB clubs. He was a coach with the Kansas City Royals and Seattle Mariners, coordinator of player development for the Royals and Mariners (part of 1988), and farm director of the Phillies (–) and Cincinnati Reds (–). He also served as a manager in the Phillies' and Colorado Rockies' farm systems.

Bedell currently lives in Pottstown, Pennsylvania.

External links

Howie Bedell at Baseball Almanac

1935 births
Living people
Atlanta Crackers players
Austin Senators players
Baseball players from Pennsylvania
Boise Braves players
Cincinnati Reds executives
Jacksonville Braves players
Kansas City Royals coaches
Louisville Colonels (minor league) players
Major League Baseball farm directors
Major League Baseball outfielders
Milwaukee Braves players
People from Clearfield, Pennsylvania
People from Pottstown, Pennsylvania
Philadelphia Phillies players
Reading Phillies players
Sacramento Solons players
Seattle Mariners coaches
Toronto Maple Leafs (International League) players
Tulsa Oilers (baseball) players
West Chester Golden Rams baseball players
York White Roses players